Detrick Oliver Hughes (born 1966) is an American poet and spoken-word artist. Hughes is known for urban commentary and life expressions offered via the genre of poetry. His latest book Unsuitable for Fools was published April 21, 2020 by Nebo Media Group.

Personal life 
Hughes was born and raised in Beaumont, Texas, which is close to the Louisiana border. In high school, he played football and was active in student government.  He graduated from French High School in 1985 where his football team captured a share of the 5A state championship with Odessa's Permian High School in 1984.

Upon graduating from French, Hughes entered the University of Houston in Houston, Texas where he received a degree in Finance. While at the University of Houston, he joined the Alpha Phi Alpha fraternity. He later received a Master of Fine Arts degree from Ashland University in Ashland, Ohio.

Publications 
Unsuitable for Fools, Nebo Media Group, 2020
Disturbing the Piece, Nebo Media Group, 2018
Goats Do Roman Villages, Nebo Media Group, 2016
Sugar-Tooth Confession, Nebo Media Group, 2012
I Am Poet, Storybookx, 2009
Chocolate Covered Raisins, Storybookx, 1995
Paper Walls, Storybookx, 1994

Audio recordings 
Cottonwood Park, 2005
The Sound of One Voice Marching, 1999

References

External links
 Tracks from Cottonwood Park by Detrick Hughes at Rhapsody.com
 Book by Detrick Hughes at Amazon.com
 Eta Mu Chapter of Alpha Phi Alpha 
 Past Readers at the Bluebird Reading Series
 Detrick Hughes on Poets & Writers (pw.org)

American male poets
1966 births
African-American poets
People from Beaumont, Texas
Living people
University of Houston alumni
Poets from Texas
21st-century American poets
21st-century American male writers
Ashland University alumni
21st-century African-American writers
20th-century African-American people
African-American male writers